Tartu JK Tammeka ladies' team is an Estonian women's association football club from Tartu. The club currently plays in Naiste Meistriliiga, the first level in the Estonian women's football system.

Current technical staff

Current squad
Squad for the 2023 season.

References

Team at Estonian Football Association

Women's football clubs in Estonia
Sport in Tartu
Tartu JK Tammeka